Sub-divisional inspector was a rank used in the London Metropolitan Police from the 1870s or 1880s until 1949. A sub-divisional inspector ranked above an inspector and below a chief inspector. As the title suggests, he or she commanded a sub-division or held an equivalent administrative position. The equivalent rank in the Criminal Investigation Department was divisional detective inspector or first class detective inspector. In 1949, the rank was absorbed into that of chief inspector, although in 1953 officers who held the position of sub-divisional commander were regraded again to superintendent grade I, and are thus equivalent to modern superintendents.

Rank was indicated by a number of diamond-shaped Bath Stars (or "pips") that were worn on either the standing collar or the epaulettes. A single star was worn from 1880 to 1922, two stars from 1922 to 1941, and three stars from 1941 to 1949.

Bertha Clayden was the first (and possibly only) woman to be promoted to the rank, in 1934.

Ranks in the Metropolitan Police